Alberto Gómez Zárate was a Salvadoran politician who served as Minister of National Defense under President Pío Romero Bosque from 1927 to 1930. He was also a candidate for president in the 1931 Salvadoran general election. His candidacy had the support of the military, but he eventually lost the election to Arturo Araujo.

References

Citations

Bibliography 

 

Date of birth missing
Date of death missing
People from San Miguel, El Salvador
Defence ministers of El Salvador